Seoul Kang clan was one of the Korean clans. Their Bon-gwan was in Seoul. Their founder was Kang Soo-il. His father was in the United States Army and his mother was a Korean. He became the founder of Seoul Kang clan when he renewed his resident registration number to play soccer in Korea.

See also 
 Korean clan names of foreign origin

References

External links